Buckeye Valley is a valley on the north side of the great bend in the Gila River, in Maricopa County, Arizona.

References

Landforms of Maricopa County, Arizona